Ehen may refer to:
Əhən, Azerbaijan
River Ehen